Life Is a Long Quiet River (French: La Vie est un long fleuve tranquille) is a 1988 French comedy film directed by Étienne Chatiliez. Through the age-old question of nature versus nurture, the film takes a satirical look at society in the industrial north by contrasting the precarious lives of the poor majority with that of the affluent church-going bourgeoisie.

Plot
In a town in the far north of France, two large families lead very different lives, The Groseilles live in squalid social housing on benefits and petty crime. The odd one is 12-year-old Maurice, as criminal as the rest but tidy and intelligent. As for the Le Quesnoys, practising Catholics in a large detached house, he is regional director of the electricity company and she, apart from church work, looks after house and children. They are experiencing problems, however, with 12-year-old Bernadette.

Twelve years earlier, in the hospital on Christmas Eve, the obstetrician delivered two babies and went home to his wife. The nurse, his lover who had hoped for a tender evening with him, in rage swapped the little Groseille girl for the Le Quesnoy boy. Twelve years later the doctor's wife dies and the nurse, who all along hoped to replace her, is rejected. She writes notes to the Groseilles and the Le Quesnoys, confessing her misdeed, and a third note to the obstetrician. He hastily leaves town.

The Le Quesnoys decide to say nothing to Bernadette and to keep her, but 'adopt' Maurice as a son, bringing him to live with them. In exchange they offer a large cash sum (plus free electricity) to the Groseilles. Although diligent at school and obedient at home, Maurice quietly sells off family effects to accumulate a secret nest egg, and gives gifts to his former family and friends. One day when Bernadette says that she hates poor people, Maurice reveals to her her origins. She sneaks round to the Groseille home and, horrified at what she sees, returns to the mansions and locks herself in her room for weeks.

Maurice keeps in touch with the Groseilles, supporting them with things he removes from the Le Quesnoy home, and one day arranges for all the children of the two families (apart from the still sequestered Bernadette) to meet by the river to drink beer and swim. The eldest Le Quesnoy boy is soon in the long grass in the willing arms of the eldest Groseille girl.

When the Le Quesnoy children stagger home tousled and tipsy, Madame Le Quesnoy has a nervous collapse and takes to the bottle. Bernadette runs away, and is returned by the police. Monsieur Le Quesnoy takes her and the maid, who is five months pregnant to a lover she will not reveal, to a seaside cottage, with the others to follow at the end of the school term. In an adjoining seaside cottage is the nurse, who at last has the obstetrician to herself after he has suffered a stroke.

Cast
 Benoît Magimel as Maurice "Momo" Groseille
 Valérie Lalonde as Bernadette Le Quesnoy
 Hélène Vincent as Madame Marielle Le Quesnoy
 André Wilms as Monsieur Jean Le Quesnoy
 Christine Pignet as Madame Marcelle Groseille
 Maurice Mons as Monsieur Frédéric "Frédo" Groseille
 Guillaume Hacquebart as Paul Le Quesnoy
 Emmanuel Cendrier as Pierre Le Quesnoy
 Jean-Brice Van Keer as Mathieu Le Quesnoy
 Praline Le Moult as Emmanuelle Le Quesnoy
 Axel Vicart as Franck Groseille
 Claire Prévost as Roselyne Groseille
 Tara Römer as Million Groseille (as Tara Romer)
 Jérôme Floch as Toc-Toc Groseille
 Sylvie Cubertafon as Ghislaine Groseille
 Catherine Jacob as Marie-Thérèse
 Patrick Bouchitey as Father Aubergé
 Daniel Gélin as Dr. Louis Mavial
 Catherine Hiegel as Josette

Cult status 
The film's initial box office success was due to clever marketing, including a trailer with no footage or scenes from the film, and a poster with only its title. In addition, the film didn't have any big names attached to it, except for veteran French actor Daniel Gelin. It was also the first feature film of Etienne Chatiliez who, until then, had a successful career directing commercials known for their quirky, whimsical style. The film attracted 2.5 million moviegoers, largely due to the word-of-mouth marketing it enjoyed.

Due in part to the film's being shown frequently on French television, it has gained something of a cult following among young French people. The song "Jésus Reviens", sung during a scene at a church, is recognisable to many French youth as one of the film's many satirical digs at the French Catholic bourgeois culture in the era it was filmed.

The 2009 film Neuilly sa mère ! was heavily influenced by Life is a Long Quiet River.

Accolades
The film received 7 nominations at the César Awards :

References

External links
 

1988 films
French comedy films
Best First Feature Film César Award winners
Films directed by Étienne Chatiliez
1988 directorial debut films
1980s French-language films
1980s French films